The Federal Ministry for Housing, Urban Development and Building, abbreviated BMWSB, is a cabinet-level ministry of the Federal Republic of Germany. It is headquartered in Berlin. The current minister is Klara Geywitz, of the Social Democratic Party. The Federal Ministry existed between 1949 and 1998 and was re-established in December 2021.

History 
In 1949 the ministry was founded under the name Federal Ministry for Reconstruction. In 1950 the ministry renamed in Federal Ministry for Housing and in 1961 was it renamed in Federal Ministry for Housing, Urban Development and Regional Planning. From 1965 the name of the ministry was the Federal Ministry for Housing and Urban Development (or 1969–72 with the reverse order of the two terms), until it finally received the name Federal Ministry for Regional Planning, Building and Urban Development in 1972, which it bore until its dissolution in 1998.

In 1998, the ministry was merged with the Federal Ministry of Transport in to the Federal Ministry of Transport, Building and Housing by an organizational decree from Chancellor Gerhard Schröder. Its first Minister was Franz Müntefering (SPD).

From 2013 to 2018 the construction area was affiliated to the Federal Ministry for the Environment, from 2018 to 2021 it belonged to the Federal Ministry of the Interior.

With the organizational decree of December 8, 2021, Chancellor Olaf Scholz ordered on the day of his appointment and with immediate effect that a Federal Ministry for Housing, Urban Development and Building be re-established.

Federal Ministers

Political Party:

References

External links 
 Federal Ministry for Housing, Urban Development and Building official web site 

Housing, Urban Development and Building
Housing ministries
Ministries established in 2021